The Palatinate campaign (30 August 1620 – 27 August 1623), also known as the Spanish conquest of the Palatinate or the Palatinate phase of the Thirty Years' War was a campaign conducted by the Imperial army against the Protestant Union in the Lower Palatinate, during the Thirty Years' War.

Background 
The Thirty Years War began in 1618 when the Protestant-dominated Bohemian Estates offered the Crown of Bohemia to Frederick of the Palatinate, rather than catholic Emperor Ferdinand II. Most of the Empire remained neutral, viewing it as an inheritance dispute, and the revolt was quickly suppressed. However, with neither Ferdinand nor Frederick prepared to back down, Imperial forces invaded the Palatinate; removal of a hereditary prince changed the nature and extent of the war.

Other protestant powers became involved, among them James VI and I, king of England and Scotland, whose daughter Elizabeth was Frederick's wife. Protestant states within the Empire saw it as a threat, including external powers who held Imperial territories; Nassau-Dillenburg was a hereditary possession of the Dutch Prince of Orange, while Christian IV of Denmark was also Duke of Holstein. The war coincided with the end of the Twelve Years' Truce between the Dutch Republic and Spain, and provided an opportunity for France, who faced a series of Spanish-backed Huguenot rebellions.

Campaign  

On the next to last day of August, after an ominous week of feints and marches along the Rhine, Ambrogio Spinola hurled an Imperial army of 24,000 men into the Lower Palatinate. By October 1st, they had taken Kreuznach, Oppenheim, and Bacharach, and occupied the Bergstrasse district.

Mainz fell to Córdoba in August 1621, while Spinola besieged Jülich; it surrendered in February 1622, cutting the supply route between the Dutch Republic and the Upper Palatinate. 

In March, Tilly and the army of the Catholic League invaded from Bavaria; he was intercepted by Protestant forces under the Margrave of Baden-Durlach and Mansfeld, leading to the inconclusive Battle of Mingolsheim on 27 April. Mansfeld then moved onto Ladenburg, while the Margrave pursued the Bavarians; unaware Tilly had linked up with Córdoba, on 8 May, he was defeated at Wimpfen. Operations were then halted by disease. 

By early November, Imperial-Spanish forces captured Heidelberg and Mannheim, the two leading cities in the Lower Palatinate. Frederick fled into exile in the United Provinces. The Spanish occupied the western part of the Palatinate, cementing their control of the strategic corridor known as the Spanish Road; Maximilian of Bavaria took the rest.

The Protestant army in the Palatinate contained volunteers from many countries, including several English regiments, led by Sir Horace Vere. Concentrated at Frankenthal, they were left isolated by defeats elsewhere, and in March 1623, James instructed them to surrender, ending the campaign.

Aftermath 
James' instructions to De Vere were based on the assumption he had agreed a deal with Philip IV to restore Frederick to his possessions, but this proved not to be the case. In February 1623, Ferdinand removed Frederick as one of the seven Imperial Prince-electors, his vote going to Maximilian of Bavaria.

On 6 August, Tilly defeated a Protestant army under Christian of Brunswick in the Battle of Stadtlohn, and Frederick signed an armistice with Ferdinand, ending the "Palatine Phase" of the Thirty Years' War. Ferdinand declared Bohemia a hereditary Habsburg possession, confiscated land from the Protestant nobles who led the revolt, and embarked on a Catholic Counter-Reformation. This ensured the war would continue, and in 1624, England, France, the Dutch Republic, Sweden, Denmark-Norway, the Duchy of Savoy, the Republic of Venice, and Brandenburg created an anti-Habsburg alliance.

References

Sources 

 
 
 
 Sunshine, Glenn S. (2005) Ron Hill The Reformation for Armchair Theologians. Westminster John Knox Press 
 
 Josef V. Polišenský/Frederick Snider: War and society in Europe (1618-1648). Bristol: Cambridge University Press, 1978. 
 
 
 

1620s conflicts
1620s in the Holy Roman Empire
Electoral Palatinate
Invasions by Spain
Military campaigns involving England
Military campaigns involving Spain
Thirty Years' War